Losengo (Lusengo) is a Bantu language spoken in the Democratic Republic of the Congo. It has had a significant effect on Lingala, the most important Bantu language in the two Congos.

Maho (2009) lists the following dialects:
 Poto (Pfoto), including Yakata
 Mpesa (Limpesa)
 Mbudza (cf. the related Budza language)
 Mangala (Ngala) [the name of the Bangi lingua franca that became Lingala]
 Loki (Boloki)
 Kangana
 Ndolo

(Yamongeri, however, is a variety of Mongo.)

References

Languages of the Democratic Republic of the Congo
Bangi-Ntomba languages